Whaleback is a remote  three-mile-long ridge located in the Sierra Nevada mountain range, in Tulare County of northern California. It is situated in Kings Canyon National Park, extending north from the Great Western Divide. Whaleback ranks as the 488th highest peak in California. The first ascent of the summit was made August 5, 1936, by May Pridham and Adele van Loben Sels.

Climate
According to the Köppen climate classification system, Whaleback is located in an alpine climate zone. Most weather fronts originate in the Pacific Ocean, and travel east toward the Sierra Nevada mountains. As fronts approach, they are forced upward by the peaks, causing them to drop their moisture in the form of rain or snowfall onto the range (orographic lift). Precipitation runoff from the mountain drains into headwaters of the Roaring River.

See also

 List of mountain peaks of California

References

External links

 Weather forecast: National Weather Service

Mountains of Tulare County, California
Mountains of Kings Canyon National Park
North American 3000 m summits
Mountains of Northern California
Sierra Nevada (United States)